

News

January
1 – Tracy Clark wins the first race of 2007, which is the first stage of the 2007 Tour de Vineyards. She finishes in front of Carissa Wilkes and Annelies Basten.
4 – Serena Sheridan wins two stages in a row to claim the overall win in the 2007 Tour de Vineyards.
11 – Carla Ryan becomes Australian time trial champion by finishing first position, 10 seconds before double 1992 Summer Olympics medalist Kathy Watt.
13 – Katie Mactier finishes in first position, being the front rider of the leading group crossing the finish in the Australian road cycling championships.
13 – Alison Shanks wins her second national title in three days after winning both the time trial and the road race in the championships of New Zealand.
20 – Jenny MacPherson wins her third consecutive Tour Down Under by finishing in front of Belinda Goss in the last stage to claim the victory as both riders were equal in points.
28 – Leontien van Moorsel announces her pregnancy and expects her first child in a few months time. An earlier pregnancy brought her a miscarriage.

UCI Road World rankings

World championships

UCI World Cup

Single day races (1.1 and 1.2)

Source

Stage races (2.1 and 2.2)

Source

National championships

UCI teams

References

See also
2007 in men's road cycling
2007 in track cycling

 
 
Women's road cycling by year